Miguel Castro Sánchez (born 26 February 1942) is a Mexican politician from the Institutional Revolutionary Party. From 2000 to 2003 he served as Deputy of the LVIII Legislature of the Mexican Congress representing Nayarit, and previously served in the Congress of Nayarit.

References

1942 births
Living people
Politicians from Tepic, Nayarit
Institutional Revolutionary Party politicians
21st-century Mexican politicians
Members of the Congress of Nayarit
20th-century Mexican politicians
Deputies of the LVIII Legislature of Mexico
Members of the Chamber of Deputies (Mexico) for Nayarit
Autonomous University of Nayarit alumni